KGB Archiver is a discontinued file archiver and data compression utility that employs the PAQ6 compression algorithm. Written in Visual C++ by Tomasz Pawlak, KGB Archiver is designed to achieve a very high compression ratio. It has ten levels of compression, from very weak to maximum. However, at higher compression levels, the time required to compress a file increases significantly. As a consequence, the program uses memory and CPU intensively.

KGB Archiver is free and open-source, released under the terms of the GNU General Public License. Version 2 beta 2 is available for Microsoft Windows and a command-line version of KGB Archiver 1.0 is available for Unix-like operating systems.

Features

 Native .kgb files and .zip files
 AES-256 encryption
 Creating self-extracting archives
 Unicode support in both the user interface and file system interactions
 Shell extension for Windows

System requirements

The minimum requirements for running KGB Archiver are:

 1.5 GHz processor
 256 MB RAM

See also

 Comparison of file archivers
 RAR (file format)
 ZPAQ

References

External links
 

File archivers
Free data compression software
Free file managers
Free software programmed in C++
Windows compression software